The Buccaneer 18, also called the Buccaneer dinghy and the Gloucester 18, is an American planing sailing dinghy that was designed in 1966 by Rod Macalpine-Downie and Dick Gibbs as a one-design racer and day sailer. The prototype was first shown in 1967 at Yachting's "One of a Kind" Regatta, in which it placed second.

Production
The design has built by a long line of companies in the United States. About 5,000 boats had been built by the time production ended in 2020.

The design was initially built by Chrysler Marine, a division of the Chrysler Corporation, in Plano, Texas, starting in 1968. The company completed just over 4,000 boats, during the period 1968-1980. As a result of a government bailout of Chrysler Marine's car manufacturing parent company, the marine division was sold in 1980 to a consortium of six former Chrysler Marine executives who formed Texas Marine International Inc. (Texas Marine Industries), retaining the location in Plano, Texas. Texas Marine built about 700 boats in 1981-1982.

Wellcraft Marine Corporation's Starwind division built the design from 1982-1984, completing about 250 boats.

From 1985-1986 Gloucester Yachts, part of Lockley Newport Boats, built 59 boats under the name Gloucester 18, before the company went out of business in 1988. Cardinal Yachts took over production from 1987-2000, building 28 boats over 13 years.

In 2008 Nickels Boatworks became the official builder. That company merged with WindRider LLC in 2015 and production continued at their Burton, Michigan plant, under the WindRider name until 2020.

Design
The Buccaneer 18 is a recreational sailboat, built predominantly of vinylester resin fiberglass, with wooden trim. It has a fractional sloop rig with foam-filled anodized aluminum spars. The hull has a spooned raked stem, a slightly reverse transom, a transom-hung, kick-up rudder controlled by a tiller and a kick-up  centerboard. It displaces  and has positive flotation for safety.

It has adjustable jib fairleads and jib roller furling. A boom vang, jib hauler and spinnaker launching tube are optional. For stowage it has a lazarette and compartment under the covered foredeck.

The design has a Portsmouth Yardstick racing average handicap of 87.9 and is raced with a minimum crew of two sailors, although it can accommodate six people.

Operational history

The type is supported by a type club, the Buccaneer 18 Class Association, that regulates the boat design and holds races.

In a 1994 review Richard Sherwood wrote that the, "Buccaneer, originally built by Chrysler, is a big boat with a 7-foot 3-inch cockpit, seating six. The boat was designed to be easy to sail and maintain. The hull is planing, with the wide beam well aft and a lean bow."

See also
List of sailing boat types

References

External links

Official website archives on Archive.org

Dinghies
1960s sailboat type designs
Two-person sailboats
Sailboat type designs by Dick Gibbs
Sailboat type designs by Rod Macalpine-Downie
Sailboat types built by Gloucester Yachts
Sailboat types built by Chrysler Marine
Sailboat types built by WindRider LLC
Sailboat types built by Nickels Boat Works
Sailboat types built by Cardinal Yachts
Sailboat types built by Texas Marine Industries